Vitters Shipyard is a shipyard specialized in building large sailing yachts. It is located in the town of Zwartsluis in the Netherlands.

History
The shipyard was established by Jan Vitters in 1990 to build mega yacht hulls. Soon after Louis Hamming joined Vitters, they began building sailing yachts, which resulted in the first yacht being delivered in 1993, Aphrodite I. 

In 2010 Vitters expanded when they acquired Green Marine which is based in Lymington, UK. Green Marine specializes in advanced composite projects. 

Vitters expanded again in 2016 through a partnership with fellow Dutch shipyard, Claasen Shipyards based in Zaandam. Both shipyards will keep their own identities, but will work together on a management level.

List of yachts built

See also
List of sailboat designers and manufacturers
List of large sailing yachts

References

Lists of ships
Motor yachts
Sailing yachts
Yachts
Lists of yachts
Dutch boat builders